Ullern Church (Ullern kirke) is a cruciform Romanesque church on the Holgerslyst property in the Ullern borough of Oslo, Norway. It is the parish church for the Ullern congregation in the Vestre Aker Deanery of the Diocese of Oslo.

History
The church is built of stone in 1903 and has seating for 800 people. The cruciform structure is dominated by an imposing central tower. The tower is square and has three windows on each side. It is topped by a tall hip roof covered in copper. The church  was designed by the architect Harald Bødtker.
The original plans for the church had been drawn up by Georg Andreas Bull, Oslo's city surveyor. The plans were reworked by the architect  Johan Storm Munch (1862-1947) in 1899 and approved by the municipality. The drawings were lost that year, when the farm where Munch had his office burned down. The assignment then went to Harald Bødtker, who had just been hired as the municipal architect in Aker.

Interior
The church is dominated by its choir apse with the fresco The Ascension, painted by Eilif Peterssen in 1908–1909. It was created in close collaboration with Domenico Erdmann. Over the altar, in front of the fresco, is a marble baldachin designed by Bødtker. The pulpit was also designed by Bødtker, and the baptismal font is from the company Johs Grønseth & Co. The stained glass dates from 1915 to 1915; it was designed and created by various artists, including Gabriel Kielland and Karl Kristiansen (1886–1971).

Cemetery
The church yard contains a cemetery (Ullern kirkegård) which is the final resting place to a number of notable Norwegian citizens including	Håkon Christie, Chrix Dahl,	Thorbjørn Egner, Carl Otto Løvenskiold and Nic Schiøll.

References

Other sources
Berit Harnæs Sivesind, ed.  (2002) Fra landsted til kirkested: Ullern kirke og menighet gjennom 100 år: 1903–2003. (Ullern: Ullern menighetsråd)

External links
Ullern kirke  (Kulturminnesøk)

Lutheran churches in Oslo
Culture in Oslo
Churches completed in 1903
1903 establishments in Norway
Stone churches in Norway
Cemeteries in Oslo
20th-century Church of Norway church buildings